John A. Gilmour (born May 17, 1993) is a Canadian professional ice hockey defenceman who is currently playing for HC Dinamo Minsk of the Kontinental Hockey League (KHL).

Playing career
Prior to joining Providence College, Gilmour played in the United States Hockey League for the Cedar Rapids RoughRiders and Gilmour Academy. It was while he was playing for the Roughriders that Gilmour committed to play NCAA Division 1 hockey for Providence College.

Gilmour was drafted 198th overall in the 2013 NHL Entry Draft by the Calgary Flames. The Flames did not offer him a contract and he continued playing for Providence College.

On August 18, 2016, Gilmour signed a two-year, $1.85 million entry-level contract with the New York Rangers. Gilmour spent the first half of the season in the AHL, and was named to the 2018 AHL all-star game. He made his NHL debut in a 4–3 win over the Flames on February 9, 2018. Gilmour recorded his first NHL goal on February 13, 2018, in a 3–2 loss to the Minnesota Wild. Gilmour became the first New York Rangers rookie defenseman to score an overtime goal when he scored a goal 1:22 into overtime on February 28, 2018, against the Vancouver Canucks.

While attending the Rangers training camp, Gilmour was reassigned to the Hartford Wolf Pack to begin the 2018–19 season. During the season, Gilmour set a Wolf Pack franchise record for goals by a defenseman in a season with 20, and was named an AHL All-star for the second consecutive season.

On July 1, 2019, Gilmour left the Rangers as a free agent to sign a one-year, one-way $700,000 contract with the Buffalo Sabres. He began the 2019–20 season, with the Sabres as a healthy scratch before he was assigned on a conditioning stint to AHL affiliate, the Rochester Americans. He appeared in 4 games with the Sabres, going scoreless.

As a free agent from the Sabres, and with the 2020–21 North American season delayed due to the COVID-19 pandemic, Gilmour belatedly signed a contract abroad in agreeing to a one-year deal with Russian club, HC CSKA Moscow of the KHL, on December 14, 2020.

Following two seasons with CSKA, culminating in capturing the Gagarin Cup, Gilmour left as a free agent and was signed to a two-year contract to continue in the KHL with Belarusian club, HC Dinamo Minsk, on July 24, 2022.

Career statistics

Awards and honours

References

External links
 

1993 births
Living people
Buffalo Sabres players
Calgary Flames draft picks
Canadian ice hockey defencemen
Cedar Rapids RoughRiders players
HC CSKA Moscow players
HC Dinamo Minsk players
Hartford Wolf Pack players
New York Rangers players
Providence Friars men's ice hockey players
Rochester Americans players
Ice hockey people from Montreal